The Battle of Kreta occurred in 1009 near the village of Kreta to the east of Thessaloníki. Since the fall of the Bulgarian capital Preslav to the Byzantines in 971, there was a constant state of war between the two Empires. From 976, the Bulgarian noble and later Emperor Samuel successfully fought against the Byzantines but, from the beginning of the 11th century,  fortune favoured Byzantium, which recovered from previous severe losses. From 1002 Basil II launched annual campaigns against Bulgaria and seized many towns. In 1009 the Byzantines engaged the Bulgarian army to the east of Thessaloníki. Little is known for the battle itself but the result was a Byzantine victory. Five years later, the Byzantines decisively defeated the Bulgarian army at Kleidion and by 1018 the country was thoroughly conquered by Basil II.

References

Bibliography 

 Gyuzelev, Vasil, Bulgaria from the second quarter of the 10th century to the beginning of the 11th century, (Balgaria ot vtorata chetvart na X do nachaloto na XI vek, България от втората четвърт на Х до началото на ХІ век), in Bulgarian, In: Dimitrov, Ilcho (Ed.), Short History of Bulgaria (Kratka istoria na Balgaria, Кратка история на България), in Bulgarian, Science and Arts Publishers, Sofia 1983
 

11th century in Bulgaria
1000s in the Byzantine Empire
Battles involving the First Bulgarian Empire
Battles of the Byzantine–Bulgarian Wars in Thessalonica
Conflicts in 1009
Battles of Basil II
1009 in Europe